Geert Deldaele (born 18 March 1964) is a Belgian sprint canoer who competed in the late 1980s. At the 1988 Summer Olympics in Seoul, he was eliminated in the semifinals of the K-1 500 m event.

References

1964 births
Belgian male canoeists
Canoeists at the 1988 Summer Olympics
Living people
Olympic canoeists of Belgium